Greensleeves Rhythm Album #87: Airwaves is an album in Greensleeves Records' rhythm album series.  It was released in February 2008 on CD and LP, and is the first album in the series after the one-year hiatus in 2007.  The album features various artists recorded over Dane "Fire Links" Johnson's "Airwaves" riddim.

Track listing
"Product of the Ghetto" - Beenie Man
"Di Sound" - Aidonia
"Borderline" - Busy Signal
"Bout K" - Assassin
"War Fa" - Zumjay
"Informer" - Anthony B
"Knock It" - Vybz Kartel
"One Away" - New Kidz
"Long Talk" - Kiprich
"Hot Gal" - Macka Diamond
"Up Inna Di Video" - Fire Links
"Hand Up" - Perfect
"Curious" - Tina
"Network" - Bling Dawg
"Promotion" - Buju Banton
"Buss It Up" - Elephant Man
"The Order" - Spragga Benz
"Nothing Nuh Change" - Bounty Killer
"Airwaves Rhythm" - Daseca

Reggae compilation albums
2008 compilation albums